Saltibum is a Brazilian reality competition series broadcast on Rede Globo, based on the Celebrity Splash! format created by Dutch company Eyeworks.

The name Saltibum is a portmanteau of the words Salto (Jump in Portuguese) and Tibum (a Portuguese onomatopoeia for Splash).

The series premiered on April 5, 2014, airing as a one-hour segment during Caldeirão do Huck, hosted by Luciano Huck.

BASC supervisor and BOC member Eduardo Falcão and Olympic athlete Hugo Parisi were judges while Roberto Gonçalves, Andrea Boehme, Cassius Duran and Juliana Veloso mentored the competitors.

On May 22, 2014, Rede Globo renewed the show for a second season.

Format

In the show, 12–14 celebrities compete against each other performing dives from extreme heights in order to impress a judging panel.

Filming began on February 13, 2014 at the Brazil's Navy Almirante Adalberto Nunes Physical Education Center (a.k.a. CEFAN), Rio de Janeiro.

Season chronology

References

External links
 Saltibum on GShow.com

2014 Brazilian television series debuts
2016 Brazilian television series endings
Brazilian reality television series
Portuguese-language television shows
Rede Globo original programming